Methylfuran may refer to:

2-Methylfuran
3-Methylfuran